Welzbach (in its upper course: Pflaumbach) is a river of Hesse and Bavaria, Germany. It is a left tributary of the Main at the district Leider of Aschaffenburg.

See also
List of rivers of Hesse
List of rivers of Bavaria

References

Rivers of Hesse
Rivers of Bavaria
Rivers of Germany